Saint-Vaast-en-Cambrésis is a commune in the Nord department in northern France. It is named after the 6th century Saint Vedast.

Heraldry

French sartorial heritage 
The city was a pivotal center of mulquinerie.

See also
Communes of the Nord department
 Chemin de fer du Cambrésis

References

Saintvaastencambresis
Nord communes articles needing translation from French Wikipedia